The Michigan Mathematics Prize Competition (MMPC) is an annual high school mathematics competition held in Michigan. First founded in 1958, the competition has grown to include over 10,000 high school participants (although middle-schoolers may also participate through a high school). The director and host of this competition changes every three years, the most recent director being Stephanie Edwards of Hope College. This competition consists of two parts, which are added together to determine score:

 Part I: A 40 question, multiple-choice exam open to all Michigan high schoolers

 Part II: A 5 question, proof exam given only to the Top 1000 scorers on Part I

The Top 100 scorers on the combined score of both parts of the competition are honored at an awards banquet, usually at the host university, although recent years have seen more than 100 people being awarded due to ties.

Problem difficulty

The problems on the competition range from basic algebra to precalculus and are within the grasp of a high schooler's mathematical knowledge. The contest contains concepts from a variety of topics, including geometry and combinatorics.

Grading 

Part I has 40 multiple-choice questions with five choices each. One point is awarded for each correct answer, giving a maximum score of forty points.

Part II has five ten point proof-based problems. The test is graded out of fifty points. This part is weighted x1.2, so the total number of points possible is 60.

The highest possible score on this test is 100 points (summing the Part I and Part II scores).

It is common for the winner of the competition to score anywhere from 90 to 95 points due to the difficulty of the exam. It sometimes falls even lower due to especially tough exams.

Through 2018, the only perfect scores were achieved in 2015, by Ankan Bhattacharya of International Academy East, and in 2016, by Chittesh Thavamani and Freddie Zhao, both of Troy High School. 2016 also marked the year of the highest scoring 3rd, 4th, and 5th-place winners in MMPC history with 3rd place scoring 99 points, 4th place scoring 98.8 points, and 5th place scoring 97.6 points. This changed in 2019, which saw all three winners, Maxim Li of Okemos High School, Steven Raphael of The Roeper School, and Alex Xu of Troy High School, receive a perfect score.

Awards

The Top 100 are invited to an awards banquet. Although the Top 50 are denoted as "bronze," no actual medal is awarded. Likewise, the Top 10 and Top 3 are called "silver" and "gold" (respectively) but do not receive medals.

The Lower 50 are deemed "honorable mentions" and receive a gift card/certificate/book.

Everyone in the Top 50 receives a scholarship ranging in size from $250 to $2500

In the 2012 contest, Akhil Nistala became the first winner in Novi High School history, breaking a streak of 6 consecutive top scorers for Detroit Country Day School.

Recent winners

1993: Amit Khetan, ICAE
1994: Amit Khetan, ICAE
1995: Amit Khetan, ICAE
1996: Bryant Matthews, Forest Hills Northern High School
1997: J. Benjamen Hough, H.H. Dow High School
1998: Michael Khoury Jr., Brother Rice High School
1999: Qian Zhang, Livonia MSC Program
2000: Qian Zhang, Livonia MSC Program
2001: Mike Asmar, Troy High School
2002: Robert Hough, Dow High School
2003: Anant Gupta, Troy High School
2004: John Zhou, Detroit Country Day School
2005: Frederic Sala, Troy High School
2006: Alan Huang, Detroit Country Day School
2007: Alan Huang, Detroit Country Day School
2008: Allen Yuan, Detroit Country Day School
2009: Allen Yuan, Detroit Country Day School
2010: Allen Yuan, Detroit Country Day School
2011: David Lu, Detroit Country Day School
2012: Akhil Nistala, Novi High School
2013: Jacqueline Bredenberg, Detroit Country Day School
2014: Jacqueline Bredenberg, Detroit Country Day School
2015: Ankan Bhattacharya, International Academy East
2016: Chittesh Thavamani, Troy High School and Freddie Zhao, Troy High School
2017: Grace Zheng, Ann Arbor Skyline High School
2018: Alex Xu, Troy High School
2019: Maxim Li, Okemos High School, Steven Raphael, The Roeper School and Alex Xu, Troy High School

External links

 MMPC Website for 2017-present
 MMPC Website for 2014-2017
 MMPC Website for 2011–2014
 Previous MMPC Newsletters with Names of MMPC Winners
 MMPC Website for 2008-2010
 MMPC Website for 2006–2007
 MMPC Website for 2002–2004
 Michigan Mathematical Association of America MMPC Article

Mathematics competitions